Geesinkorchis is a genus of flowering plants from the orchid family, Orchidaceae. It contains 4 known species, native to Borneo and Sumatra.

Geesinkorchis alaticallosa de Vogel - Borneo 
Geesinkorchis breviunguiculata Shih C.Hsu - Sumatra
Geesinkorchis phaiostele (Ridl.) de Vogel  - Borneo 
Geesinkorchis quadricarinata Shih C.Hsu - Sarawak

See also 
 List of Orchidaceae genera

References 

  (1984) Blumea 30: 199.
  (2005) Taxonomic revision of Geesinckorchis (Coelogyninae; Epidendroideae; Orchidaceae). Blumea 50: 505–517.
  2005. Handbuch der Orchideen-Namen. Dictionary of Orchid Names. Dizionario dei nomi delle orchidee. Ulmer, Stuttgart
  (2006) Epidendroideae (Part One). Genera Orchidacearum 4: 62ff. Oxford University Press.

External links 

Arethuseae genera
Coelogyninae
Orchids of Asia